is a professional Japanese baseball player. He plays outfielder for the Yokohama DeNA BayStars.

External links

 NPB.com

1986 births
Living people
People from Ōamishirasato
Waseda University alumni
Japanese baseball players
Nippon Professional Baseball outfielders
Yokohama BayStars players
Yokohama DeNA BayStars players
Baseball people from Chiba Prefecture